Ada TV, is a television channel which broadcasts in both satellite and terrestrial in the Turkish Republic of Northern Cyprus.
On 20 July 2008, the prime minister of Turkey Recep Tayyip Erdogan and the Turkish Republic of Northern Cyprus Prime Minister Ferdi Sabit Soyer, Star Media Group Chairman Ali Özmen Safa attended the opening ceremony of Ada TV which took place in front of the offices of Star Media Group. This special day also being the anniversary of the ascension of Northern Cyprus.

On 19 September 2008, Star Media Group and Girne American University at the offices the Office of the Presidency of GAU,  top-level administrators of both institutions participated in a ceremony whereby a protocol was signed. According to this agreement, all GAÜ organization and activities would be included in the Ada TV news. In addition, Ada TV would grant eligible students internship training within the group. Experts to be appointed, information, technical support bilateral assistance as specified would be provided.

In December 2009, Ada TV won the title as the first television channel to broadcast in England live with 3G from the Turkish Republic of Northern Cyprus.

References 

24-hour television news channels
Business-related television channels
XM Satellite Radio channels
Digital-only radio stations
Television channels and stations established in 2008